The Glorious Song Stakes is a Thoroughbred horse race run annually in mid-November at Woodbine Racetrack in Toronto, Ontario, Canada. A race open to Two-year-old fillies, it is contested over a distance of Seven furlongs. Since 2006 the track surface has been made of a synthetic "all weather" dirt composite.

Inaugurated in 1981 at Toronto's now defunct Greenwood Raceway, in 1994 the race was moved to the Woodbine facility.

It is named in honour of Canadian Horse Racing Hall of Fame filly, Glorious Song, owned by Frank Stronach and Nelson Bunker Hunt.

The Glorious Song Stakes was run in two divisions in 1985.

Records
Speed  record: 
 1:21.52 - Win the War (2017)

Most wins by an owner:
 3 - Sam-Son Farm (1986, 1987, 1997)
 3 - Live Oak Plantation (2016, 2018, 2020)

Most wins by a jockey:
 7 - Patrick Husbands (2002, 2006, 2009, 2013, 2014, 2017, 2020)

Most wins by a trainer:
 9 - Mark Casse (2004, 2005, 2006, 2013, 2014, 2016, 2017, 2018, 2020)

Winners

References
 The Glorious Song Stakes at Pedigree Query
 Woodbine Stakes History (pdf) Glorious Song Stakes on page 50

Ungraded stakes races in Canada
Flat horse races for two-year-old fillies
Recurring sporting events established in 1981
Woodbine Racetrack
1981 establishments in Ontario